Peter Streckfus (born 1969 in San Antonio, Texas) is an American poet.

His first book, The Cuckoo, won the 2003 Yale Series of Younger Poets competition, chosen by Louise Glück. 
His second book, Errings, won Fordham University Press's 2013 POL Editor's Prize.

His honors include the 2013-14 Brodsky Rome Prize Fellowship in Literature at the American Academy in Rome. 
He is a professor of English at George Mason University.

Bibliography

Further reading
Art at Our Doorstep: San Antonio Writers and Artists featuring Peter Streckfus. Edited by Nan Cuba and Riley Robinson (Trinity University Press, 2008).

References

External links
 Author Page: peterstreckfus.com >

Reviews
 Microreview: Peter Streckfus, The Cuckoo, The Boston Review, April 1, 2005, Garth Greenwell 
 Poets' Corner, The Los Angeles Times, June 27, 2004, Carol Muske-Dukes 
The Cuckoo, The Constant Critic, September 11, 2004, Ray McDaniel
 The Cuckoo (review), The Missouri Review, Volume 27, Number 2, Summer 2004
 The Cuckoo, The Virginia Quarterly Review, October 1, 2004, John Casteen, IV 
"The Cuckoo", Electronic Poetry Review, Amy Schroeder, Issue 7

Living people
American male poets
George Mason University alumni
Western Connecticut State University faculty
University of Alabama faculty
1969 births
Yale Younger Poets winners
21st-century American poets
21st-century American male writers